Club de Fútbol Fuenlabrada, S.A.D. is a football club based in Fuenlabrada, Community of Madrid, Spain, that currently competes in Primera División RFEF – Group 1, the third tier of the Spanish league system. It was founded in 1975. It holds home matches at Estadio Fernando Torres.

History
Fuenlabrada was founded in 1975, as a merge between San Esteban and Atlético Fuenlabrada. The idea came from the mayor of the city, Regino Benítez, who suggested the directors of both clubs can unite their efforts and by this receive a higher municipal grant. A key role in the birth of the new club was played by Ramón García Pajuelo, who was appointed secretary of the entity and is still linked to the club as its delegate. In 1986, the team was first promoted to Tercera Division, finishing third from bottom in their debut campaign.

With Julián Pérez as a president, Fuenlabrada achieved new level, culminating with the promotion to Segunda División B in 1994. They bounced between that and Segunda Division B for the next 30 years. For the 1997-98 season, the club made infusions of certain amounts of money to hire a new coach Eduardo Caturla and new players in order to achieve promotion, but finished the season only in 9th position in the Segunda División B. With the will to achieve promotion, for the following season the club bet on another coach of recognized prestige and with the experience in La Liga, Felix Barderas.

The team had its best result in the Copa del Rey in 2017–18, reaching the last 32 through a bye and wins over Mérida AD and CD Calahorra. In a two-game tie with European champions Real Madrid, the side lost 4–2 on aggregate, having drawn the second leg 2–2 away at the Santiago Bernabéu Stadium.

Fuenlabrada played at La Aldehuela before moving into the Estadio Fernando Torres in August 2011, named after former Spanish international forward Fernando Torres, who was born in the town but never represented the club. In 2016–17, the club finished in 3rd position in Segunda División B, before losing each match of the playoffs 0-1 to CF Villanovense. Mere was appointed as coach for the 2018-19 season.

On 2 June 2019, Fuenlabrada was promoted for the first time ever to Segunda División by defeating Recreativo de Huelva 4–1 on aggregate in the play-offs. Ten days later, the club took the Segunda B title with a 2–1 aggregate win over Racing de Santander.

On 7 May 2022, Fuenlabrada was relegated to Primera RFEF, bringing their three-season spell in the second tier to an end.

Season to season

3 seasons in Segunda División
1 season in Primera División RFEF
19 seasons in Segunda División B
14 seasons in Tercera División

Current squad
.

Reserve team

Out on loan

Current technical staff

Reserve team
Fuenlabrada's reserve team was founded in 2015, and it currently plays in the Preferente de Madrid – Group 2.

Famous players

Pedro León
Stéphane Mbia
Cata Díaz

Famous coaches

References

External links

Official website 
Futbolme team profile 
Club & stadium history - Estadios de España 

 
Football clubs in the Community of Madrid
Association football clubs established in 1975
1975 establishments in Spain
Segunda División clubs
Primera Federación clubs